College Football's National Championship II is a video game developed by Sega Sports and published by Sega for the Sega Genesis.

Gameplay
College Football's National Championship II is an update of College Football's National Championship.

Reception
Next Generation reviewed the Genesis version of the game, rating it four stars out of five, and stated that "The way the camera zooms in close for runs or passes is smooth and it greatly enhances the gameplay.  Still, EA's College Football USA and its 107 division IA teams have evened things up this year."

Reviews
Electronic Gaming Monthly (Feb, 1996)
GamePro (Dec, 1995)
Video Games & Computer Entertainment - Dec, 1995
The Video Game Critic Nov 6th, 1999

References

External links
 College Football's National Championship II at GameFAQs
 College Football's National Championship II at MobyGames

1995 video games
BlueSky Software games
College football video games
North America-exclusive video games
Sega video games
Sega Genesis games
Sega Genesis-only games
Multiplayer and single-player video games
Video games developed in the United States
Video games scored by Sam Powell